The Sleeping Volcano (German: Der schlummernde Vulkan) is a 1922 German silent drama film directed by James Bauer and starring Margit Barnay, Hans Mierendorff and Margarete Schön.

Cast
In alphabetical order
 Margit Barnay
 Friedrich Berger
 Hertha Katsch
 Hans Mierendorff
 Paul Rehkopf
 Joseph Römer
 Margarete Schön

References

Bibliography
 Grange, William. Cultural Chronicle of the Weimar Republic. Scarecrow Press, 2008.

External links

1922 films
Films of the Weimar Republic
Films directed by James Bauer
German silent feature films
German black-and-white films
1922 drama films
German drama films
Silent drama films
1920s German films
1920s German-language films